Filtration camps or filtration points (the official name) were used by the Russian federal forces for their mass internment centers during the First Chechen Wars in 1994–1996 and then again during the Second Chechen War between 1999 and 2003.

"Filtration" system
The term "filtration point" re-appeared during the First Chechen War as name of the facilities illegally created for the purpose of holding the persons detained by the federal forces in the course of an operation "to restore constitutional order" in Chechen Republic territory in 1994–1996. During the Second Chechen War, beginning in 1999, some of the "filtration"  facilities got legitimate status of investigative isolators (SIZO) subordinated to the Ministry of Justice and temporary detention isolators (IVS) subordinated to the Interior Ministry, but with an unclear legal status and no apparent basis in the criminal code of the Russian Federation.

According to the Russian human rights group Memorial, "by the most modest estimations", the overall number of those having passed through the established and ad hoc "filtration points" reaches at least 200,000 people (out of Chechnya's population of less than one million), of whom "practically all" were subjected to beatings and torture, and some were summarily executed. According to Memorial, the purpose of the "filtration" system in Chechnya, besides being part of the general state terror system for suppression and intimidation of the population, was enforced recruitment of a network of informers, and was characterised by its non-selectivity, that is by arbitrary arrests and mass detentions of innocent people.

In October 2000, Human Rights Watch (HRW) published its 99-page investigative report "Welcome to Hell", detailing how Russian troops have detained thousands of Chechens, "many of them were detained arbitrarily, with no evidence of wrongdoing. Guards at detention centers systematically beat Chechen detainees, some of whom have also been raped or subjected to other forms of torture. Most were released only after their families paid large bribes to Russian officials." HRW noted that despite the European Union-sponsored United Nations Commission on Human Rights resolution urging Russia to launch a national commission of inquiry that would establish accountability for abuse, the Russian authorities did not launch any "credible and transparent effort to investigate these abuses and bring the perpetrators to justice."

"Filtration points" in the Second Chechen War
One of main, and the best known, filtration camps in Chechnya was the Chernokozovo detention center, set up in a former prison in 1999. Chernokozovo was subject of a significant attention in 2000, as well as at least two illegal detention and torture related rulings by the European Court of Human Rights (the cases of the Chitayev brothers in 2007 and of Zura Bitiyeva in 2008, the latter also including the subsequent summary execution of her and her family).

In 2000, Amnesty International identified the following "filtration camps": the detention facility in Kadi-Yurt, a makeshift detention facility in a school in Urus-Martan, and other makeshift camps in various locations in Chechnya, including at a fruit warehouse in Tolstoy-Yurt, at a poultry processing plant and the basement of the "Chekhkar" café in Chiri-Yurt, and in the capital Grozny. The facilities outside of Chechnya included the prison hospital and the SIZO at Pyatigorsk in Stavropol Territory.

According to Memorial, other long-term "filtration points" run by federal forces included the notorious "Titanic" facility located between Aleroy and Tsentoroy, the site of a "disappearance" of many people. Illegal prisons were created at the places of deployment of military units or special units of the Ministry of Interior and the prisoners kept in them were not officially registered anywhere neither as being detained. The largest and best known of them was located at the military base at Khankala, where many prisoners were held in the holes dug in the ground. In addition, temporary "filtration camps" were set up in the open fields or in abandoned premises on the outskirts of the towns and villages in the course of numerous "mopping-up" (zachistka) special operations.

In 2006, Russia's human rights groups produced a documentary evidence of a secret torture center in the basement of a former school for deaf children in Oktyabrsokye district of Grozny, which they alleged had been used by a unit of the Russian special police OMON that had been stationed nearby during the early 2000s to hold, torture and kill hundreds of people, whose bodies were then dumped throughout Chechnya. A member of the unit, Sergei Lapin was convicted in 2005 of torturing Chechen student Zelimkhan Murdalov, one of the "disappeared" who remains unaccounted for). Activists said they collected the evidence just in time, before the building housing the cellar was demolished in an apparent crude cover-up attempt.

See also
 Russian war crimes
 Mass graves in Chechnya
 Russian filtration camps of Ukrainians
 Nazi concentration camps

References

External links
 "Welcome to Hell": Arbitrary Detention, Torture, and Extortion in Chechnya, Human Rights Watch, 1 October 2000 (UNHCR)

2000 in Russia
Child abuse
Internment camps
History of Chechnya
Military prisoner abuse scandals
Police brutality in Russia
Prisons in Russia
Torture in Russia
War crimes of the Second Chechen War
Wartime sexual violence